readelf is a program for displaying various information about object files on Unix-like systems such as objdump. It is part of the GNU binutils.

readelf and objdump 
objdump has a similar function but with different features like disassembling. The main difference is that readelf does not depend on BFD and helps to check if BFD works.

Example 
The following command displays the contents of the file's dynamic section (to examine the shared library dependencies and rpath): $ readelf -d <file name>

References

Unix programming tools
GNU Project software